Limetree Festival is a soul and jazz festival that takes place at Limetree Farm nature reserve near Grewelthorpe, North Yorkshire, England.

External links
 Article from the Yorkshire Evening Post reviewing the Limetree Festival
 Virtual Festival rates the Limetree Festival
 The Limetree Festival 2009 - DailyMusicGuide

Music festivals in North Yorkshire